Loxonematoidea is an extinct taxonomic superfamily of sea snails, marine gastropod molluscs, belonging to the Murchisoniinae.

References

Prehistoric gastropods